The 1901 Oregon Webfoots football team represented the University of Oregon in the 1901 college football season. It was the Webfoots' eighth season; they competed as an independent and were led by head coach Warren W. Smith. They finished the season with a record of three wins, four losses and one tie (3–4–1).

Schedule

References

Oregon
Oregon Ducks football seasons
Oregon Webfoots football